The following is a list of Malayalam films released in the year 1985.

Dubbed films

References

1985
Lists of 1985 films by country or language
1985
Malayalam